Joseph Gough McCormick  (1874–1924) was Dean of Manchester in the first quarter of the 20th century.

Born into an ecclesiastical (and cricketing) family in London in 1874, he was educated at Exeter School and St John's College, Cambridge. He was ordained in 1897. He began his career at Great Yarmouth, where as a keen amateur cricketer, he played minor counties cricket for Norfolk from 1899 to 1909, making thirty appearances. He was later vicar of St Paul's, Princes Park, Liverpool. Later he was Vicar of St. Michael's Church, Chester Square and an Honorary Chaplain to the King before his elevation to the Deanery.  He died in post on 30 August 1924.

Notes

1874 births
Cricketers from Greater London
People educated at Exeter School
Alumni of St John's College, Cambridge
Honorary Chaplains to the King
Deans of Manchester
1924 deaths
English cricketers
Norfolk cricketers